Hazle Creek is a tributary source stream of the Lehigh and Delaware Rivers, via Black Creek, Carbon County, which originates in southern Luzerne County on the east side of the saddle of an important mountain pass hosting a transportation infrastructure corridor. The creek's source area is located within the east-side neighborhoods of Hazleton, Pennsylvania. Hazle Creek's source springs originate in the terrain along the upper edge of the Lehigh River drainage basin, TBDL ft above its mouth, and TBDL above mean sea level.

Hazle Creek flows from its headwaters near Hazleton to its mouth near Weatherly. Due to underground mining, most of the surface drainage in the Hazleton Basin has been destroyed. Surface water infiltrates into the underlying minepool through abandoned strip mines.

Initially part of the terrain traversed by the Amerindian trail known to white settlers as the "Warriors' Path", the creek's water gap hosted an early crude wagon road, the Lausanne-Nescopeck Road, which connected the Moravians in Bethlehem and the lower Luzerne County settlements of "Saint Anthony's Wilderness", the earliest being those along the Nescopeck Creek in a village known as St. Johns in the late 1700s. The city of Hazleton sits astride the pass connecting the watershed of the Lehigh to the Susquehanna-drained tributaries along the west side of the borough. The banks of all three water courses host both automotive and rail roadbeds.

Footnotes

References

Rivers of Carbon County, Pennsylvania
Rivers of Luzerne County, Pennsylvania